AtomAge magazine (later AtomAge International magazine) was a fetish magazine published in Britain by the clothes designer John Sutcliffe in the 1970s as an offshoot of his AtomAge fetish clothing business. The magazine has been called the "underground bible of leather, rubber and vinyl fetish wear throughout the 1970s" and documented Britain's S&M scene. The first AtomAge clothing catalogue was published in 1965 and it expanded into a magazine in 1972. 

The magazine specialized in leather, rubber and PVC fetishism, with a heavy emphasis on rubber and leather catsuits, cloaks, and gasmasks. In 1981, the publication was split in two: AtomAge Rubberist (similar to the original AtomAge) and AtomAge Bondage (which contained more overtly S&M content).  Sutcliffe made this decision because the Bondage material he began to introduce in the late 1970s issues of the original AtomAge bothered some rubber enthusiasts. Both magazines remained in print until 1985.

One of Sutcliffe's main goals was to dignify the popular perception of fetish. He is regarded as one of the patron saints of the worldwide Rubberist community as a result.

2010 saw the publication of Dressing For Pleasure, The Best Of AtomAge, a comprehensive hardback book celebrating both the magazine and company.

References

Pornographic magazines published in the United Kingdom
Fetish magazines
Defunct magazines published in the United Kingdom
Magazines established in 1972
Magazines disestablished in 1980